Gallai may refer to:

 Gallai is a Pushtho word meaning Hail. (Hail) in English language means small frozen pellets fall from clouds during a severe storm. 
 Gallai can also be used as a girl name in Pushto language. Pushto language is mainly spoken in Afghanistan and Pushtoonistan (northern parts of Pakistan) 
 Gallai, Pakistan
 Gallai, Bangladesh
 Tibor Gallai, (1912-1992), a Hungarian mathematician
 Gallai, worshippers of the Phrygian deity Cybele